Md Wahid-Uz-Zaman BSP, ndc, aowc, psc, te is a retired Major General of Bangladesh Army who served as the Commandant of the Military Institute of Science and Technology.

Career 
Wahid-Uz-Zaman was the Director General of Bangladesh Telecommunication Regulatory Commission in 2015.

Wahid-Uz-Zaman is a member of the board of Trustee of Bangladesh Army University of Engineering & Technology. He is a member of the Senate Committee of Bangladesh University of Professionals.

On 26 October 2021, Wahid-Uz-Zaman was appointed Director General of Department of Immigration and Passports. But on next day Ministry of Public administration cancel the appointment and issued a gazette notification where it reinstate Major General Mohammad Ayub Chowdhury to his position and bring back Wahid-Uz-Zaman to Armed forces.

References 

Living people
Bangladesh Army generals
Year of birth missing (living people)